The Ibani tribe is a subgroup of the Ijaw ethnic group that lives in the Bonny and Opobo areas of Rivers State, Nigeria, on the Atlantic coast. Bonny town is the tribal seat of the Ibani which is located on the bight of Bonny River. Though the Ndoki dialect of Igbo language is spoken predominantly by residents of Bonny and Opobo, the Ibani dialect of Ijaw is native to the Ibani people.

The neighbours of the Ibani include the Kalabari to the west, Okrika to the North and Andoni to the east.  
Bonny's development was also shaped by the tribe's close interaction with European traders. The Kingdom of Bonny was a major trading center from the 16th century onwards they were known for the exportation of palm oil and palm kernel. The indigenes of Bonny and Opobo kingdoms are collectively known as the Ibani people.

Ndoki dialect of Igbo language is widely spoken. Historically, Bonny engaged in several wars against its nearby rivals, such as Elem Kalabari and Obolo people or Andoni.

Other important Ibani settlements include: Finima, Abalama, Oloma, kuruama etc.

References

Igbo
Indigenous peoples of Rivers State